Teucrium ackermannii, the silver germander, is a flowering plant in the family Teucrioideae. It is of unknown origin and naming.

Cultivation 
This plant has gained the Royal Horticultural Society's Award of Garden Merit.

References 

ackermannii